The President of the National Assembly of the Republic of Artsakh (Armenian: Ազգային ժողովի նախագահ, Azgayin zhoghovi naxagah) is the Speaker of the House in the Parliament of Artsakh.

Until 1995, the post was called Chairman of the Supreme Council of the Nagorno-Karabakh Republic. From January 1992 to December 1994, until Robert Kocharyan was elected as the President of Artsakh, the Chairman was de facto the head of state of the republic.

The incumbent speaker is Arthur Tovmasyan of Free Motherland, since 21 May 2020.

List of Presidents of the National Assembly

Sources 
 Office of the Republic of Artsakh

See also

National Assembly (Artsakh)
Politics of Artsakh
President of Artsakh

Nagorno-Karabakh
Politicians from the Republic of Artsakh